Châteaubourg is the name of 2 communes in France:

 Châteaubourg, Ardèche
 Châteaubourg, Ille-et-Vilaine